The First Chicago Method or Venture Capital Method is a business valuation approach used by venture capital and private equity investors that combines elements of both a multiples-based valuation and a discounted cash flow (DCF) valuation approach.  

The First Chicago Method was first developed by, and consequently named for, the venture capital arm of the First Chicago bank, the predecessor of private equity firms Madison Dearborn Partners and GTCR.

It was first discussed academically in 1987.

Method
The First Chicago Method takes account of payouts to the holder of specific investments in a company through the holding period under various scenarios; see  Quantifying uncertainty under Corporate finance. Most often this methodology will involve the construction of:
 An "upside case" or "best-case scenario" (often, the business plan submitted)
 A "base case"
 A "downside" or "worst-case scenario."

Once these have been constructed, the valuation proceeds as follows. 
First, for each of the three cases, a scenario specific, internally consistent forecast of cashflows - see  discussion under Financial modeling -  is constructed for the years leading up to the assumed divestment by the private equity investor.
Next, a divestment price - i.e. a Terminal value - is modelled by assuming an exit multiple consistent with the scenario in question. (Of course, the divestment may take various forms - see Private equity #Investments in private equity.)
The cash flows and exit price are then discounted using the investor’s required return, and the sum of these is the value of the business under the scenario in question.  
Finally, each of the three scenario-values are multiplied through by a probability corresponding to each scenario (as estimated by the investor). The value of the investment is then the probability weighted sum of the three scenarios.

Use
The method is used particularly in the valuation of growth companies which often do not have historical financial results that can be used for meaningful comparable company analysis.  Multiplying actual financial results against a comparable valuation multiple often yields a value for the company that is objectively too low given the prospects for the business.  

Often the First Chicago Method may be preferable to a Discounted Cash Flow taken alone. This is because such income-based business value assessment may lack the support generally observable in the market place. Indeed, professionally performed business appraisals go further and use a set of methods under all three approaches to business valuation.

Variations of the First Chicago Method are employed in a number of markets, including the private equity secondary market where investors project outcomes for portfolios of private equity investments under various scenarios.

See also
rNPV: cash flows, as opposed to scenarios, are probability-weighted.
Expected commercial value
Valuation using discounted cash flows #Determine equity value

Notes

References
Ann-Kristin Achleitner and  Eva Lutz. (2008). First Chicago Method: Alternative Approach to Valuing Innovative Start-Ups in the Context of Venture Capital, Social Science Research Network Accepted Paper Series.
James L. Plummer. (1997). A Primer on Venture Capital Financial Calculations, 23rd Annual Venture Capital Institute. 
C.P. Schumann (2006). Improving Certainty in Valuations using the Discounted Cash Flow Method, Valuation Strategies Magazine, September/October 2006. 

Venture capital
Madison Dearborn Partners companies
Fundamental analysis
Valuation (finance)